Heshmat is a given and surname. The following individuals have the name:

Given name
Heshmat Fahmi, a member of the Pan-African Parliament and a member of the People's Assembly of Egypt 
Heshmat Mohajerani (born 1938), an Iranian football coach, manager, and former player
Heshmat Sanjari (1918–1995), an Iranian conductor and composer
Heshmat Tabarzadi, an Iranian democratic activist
Heshmat Taleqani a physician in Lahijan and one of Mirza Kuchak Khan allies during the Jangal movement

Surname
Hassan Heshmat (born 1920), an Egyptian sculptor
Hooshang Heshmat, CEO and co-founder of Mohawk Innovative Technology